Mycetophila unipunctata is a species of fungus gnats in the family Mycetophilidae.

References

External links

 

Mycetophilidae
Articles created by Qbugbot
Insects described in 1818